is a Japanese football player for Nagano Parceiro.

Club career statistics
Updated to 23 February 2020.

References

External links
Profile at Nagano Parceiro
Profile at Giravanz Kitakyushu

1984 births
Living people
Ryutsu Keizai University alumni
People from Higashiyamato, Tokyo
Association football people from Tokyo Metropolis
Japanese footballers
J1 League players
J2 League players
J3 League players
FC Tokyo players
Shonan Bellmare players
Giravanz Kitakyushu players
AC Nagano Parceiro players
Association football goalkeepers